Steve Mandanda Mpidi (born 28 March 1985) is a French professional footballer who plays as a goalkeeper for Ligue 1 club Rennes.

Mandanda spent most of his professional career with Marseille, making over 600 appearances across all competitions in two spells with the club, and was voted Ligue 1 Goalkeeper of the Year five times.

Making his debut in 2008, Mandanda represented France at seven international tournaments: four UEFA European Championships (2008, 2012, 2016 and 2020) and three FIFA World Cups (2010, 2018, 2022), winning the tournament in 2018.

Club career

Early career
Mandanda was born on 28 March 1985 in Kinshasa, Democratic Republic of the Congo (then Zaire), but he moved with his family to Évreux, France when he was two years old. He practiced boxing before joining the local team ALM Évreux at age nine.

Le Havre
Mandanda made his league debut for Le Havre in August 2005, and did not concede a goal until his fourth match. He played 30 league matches in the 2005–06 season and 37 in 2006–07, with his performances attracting the attention of other clubs. Following an unsuccessful trial at Aston Villa prior to the 2007–08 season, he joined Marseille in summer 2007.

Marseille

At the start of his first season with Marseille, Mandanda was regarded as an understudy to first choice keeper Cédric Carrasso. However a knee injury ruled Carrasso out for six months, leaving the way clear for Mandanda to become a regular fixture in Ligue 1, Champions League and UEFA Cup matches. On 5 March 2008, Mandanda joined Marseille on a permanent four-year contract.

At the end of Mandanda's final season at Marseille he was named as the club's Player of the Season. It was the second time that he won the award having previously done so in the 2007-08 campaign.

Crystal Palace
On 1 July 2016, Premier League club Crystal Palace announced that they had completed the signing of Mandanda on a free transfer from Marseille. He struggled to make an impact, being injured for most of the season. He made just ten appearances.

Return to Marseille
On 11 July 2017, Mandanda returned to Olympique de Marseille on a three-year contract for €3 million.

On 22 December 2018, Mandanda played his 500th match for Marseille, in a 1–1 draw at Angers. On 25 August 2020, aged 35, he prolonged his contract until 2024.

Rennes 
On 6 July 2022, Rennes announced the signing of Mandanda on a two-year deal.

International career

Mandanda won a number of caps for the France national under-21 team and was named in the French squad for the 2006 UEFA European Under-21 Championship.

For the first time, in 2007, he took part in the French A-squad pre-selection.

He played in a friendly match with France B against Congo DR on 5 February 2008, in which he was substituted at half time, and his younger brother Parfait came on for Congo. He made his full international debut on 27 May 2008 in a 2–0 victory against Ecuador in a Euro 2008 warm-up friendly, coming on as a half-time substitute for Sébastien Frey, and was subsequently nominated as the third-choice goalkeeper in the French squad for the tournament in Austria and Switzerland.

He started the 2010 FIFA World Cup qualifying campaign as France's first-choice goalkeeper, making his competitive international debut on 6 September 2008 in their opening qualifier against Austria. However, was replaced in the summer of 2009, as Raymond Domenech chose Olympique Lyonnais goalkeeper Hugo Lloris over him for the international starting eleven. Mandanda was a member of France's World Cup team, but did not appear in any of its three matches in the competition.

On 6 June 2011, Mandanda captained the French in a 4–1 friendly win away to Ukraine at the Donbass Arena. He was called up for UEFA Euro 2012 in Poland and Ukraine.

Mandanda was originally named in the squad also for the 2014 FIFA World Cup, but sustained an injury before the tournament and was replaced by Stéphane Ruffier of AS Saint-Étienne. He was part of the squad that came runners-up at UEFA Euro 2016 on home soil.

Mandanda was part of the 23-man France squad that won the 2018 FIFA World Cup in Russia. He played their goalless group game against Denmark, his debut tournament appearance, at the age of 33.

In November 2022, he was named in the French squad for the 2022 FIFA World Cup in Qatar. On 14 January 2023, Mandanda announced his retirement from international football.

Personal life
Mandanda has three younger brothers, all of whom are goalkeepers: Parfait, goalkeeper of Charleroi and Congo DR national football team; Riffi, goalkeeper of Kongsvinger; and Over, who plays for Bordeaux. He enjoys spending time with his family in the city of Marseille, where he lives. He has earned the nickname "Frenchie" amongst his relatives for having chosen to play for the France national football team rather than Congo, his country of birth.

Career statistics

Club

International

Honours
Marseille
Ligue 1: 2009–10
Coupe de la Ligue: 2009–10, 2010–11, 2011–12
Trophée des Champions: 2010, 2011
UEFA Europa League runner-up: 2017–18

France
FIFA World Cup: 2018; runner-up: 2022
UEFA European Championship runner-up: 2016

Individual
Toulon Tournament Best Goalkeeper: 2005
UNFP Ligue 1 Player of the Month: February 2008, August 2008, September 2017
UNFP Ligue 1 Goalkeeper of the Year: 2007–08, 2010–11, 2014–15, 2015–16, 2017–18
UNFP Ligue 1 Team of the Year: 2007–08, 2010–11, 2014–15, 2015–16, 2017–18
Marseille Olympian of the Season: 2007–08, 2015–16

Orders
Knight of the Legion of Honour: 2018

References

External links

 
 
 
 

1985 births
Living people
Footballers from Kinshasa
Sportspeople from Évreux
Footballers from Normandy
French footballers
Association football goalkeepers
Le Havre AC players
Olympique de Marseille players
Crystal Palace F.C. players
Stade Rennais F.C. players
Ligue 2 players
Ligue 1 players
Premier League players
France under-21 international footballers
France international footballers
UEFA Euro 2008 players
2010 FIFA World Cup players
UEFA Euro 2012 players
UEFA Euro 2016 players
2018 FIFA World Cup players
UEFA Euro 2020 players
2022 FIFA World Cup players
French expatriate footballers
Expatriate footballers in England
French expatriate sportspeople in England
FIFA World Cup-winning players
Chevaliers of the Légion d'honneur
Black French sportspeople
Naturalized citizens of France
French sportspeople of Democratic Republic of the Congo descent